Shahrak-e Dam (also Romanized as Shahraḵ-e Dām) is a village in Qomrud Rural District, in the Central District of Qom County, Qom Province, Iran. At the 2006 census, its population was 829, in 201 families.

References 

Populated places in Qom Province